Samad bey Sadykh bey oghlu Mehmandarov (October 16, 1855 – February 12, 1931) was an Azerbaijani General of the Artillery in the Imperial Russian Army and served as Minister of Defense of the Azerbaijan Democratic Republic.

Early life
Samad bey Mehmandarov was born on October 16, 1855, in Lankaran, Azerbaijan in a noble family originally from Shusha. He graduated from 2nd Constantine Military School in St. Petersburg in 1875, was conferred the rank of podporuchik and assigned to 1st Turkestan artillery brigade. In the course of military service he was promoted to poruchik in 1877 and seconded two years later to 2nd artillery brigade in St. Petersburg.

Active duty
In 1885 shtabs-kapitan Mehmandarov was assigned to 38th artillery brigade in the Caucasus, where he served 9 years. In 1894, 38th artillery brigade was transferred to Poland, where he became a member of court martial. In 1898, captain Mehmandarov was promoted to lieutenant-colonel and appointed the commander of 1st battery of 3rd artillery battalion. The same year, Mehmandarov’s battery was moved to Transbaikal region and took part in China Relief Expedition in 1901. For the services in battle Mehmandarov was conferred the rank of colonel. In 1903 he completed a course in Tsarskoye Selo Officer's Artillery College.

When the Russo-Japanese War broke out in 1904, Mehmandarov was appointed the commander of 7th Eastern Siberia artillery battalion. During the siege of Port Arthur he was the commander of the Eastern Front Artillery. For the services in battle he was promoted to major general and decorated with the Order of Saint George of IV degree. After the capitulation of the fortress the garrison was in Japanese captivity. When Japanese commanders allowed the captured Russian officers to return home in exchange to signing an obligation not to fight against Japan, Mehmandarov refused and preferred to stay with his soldiers.

Upon his return from captivity Mehmandarov was appointed the commander of 7th East Siberian Artillery Brigade in 1906, and became the commander of 3rd Siberian Army Corps artillery a year later. In 1908, he was conferred the rank of lieutenant-general. In 1910, he was appointed the commander of 1st Caucasus Division; in 1913 he became the commander of 21st Infantry Division and in this position entered World War I within 3rd Caucasus Army Corps. Under Mehmandarov’s command the division earned the reputation of one of the best in the Russian Army, and 81st Apsheron and 83rd Samur regiments especially distinguished themselves. He was decorated with the Order of Saint George of III degree for the battles of 27 – 29 September 1914, and Saint George Sword decorated with diamonds for the battle near Ivangorod on 14 February 1915. The latter was a very rare military award, only eight Russian commanders received it during the entire course of the World War I. 

On December 11, 1914, Mehmandarov was appointed the commander of 2nd Caucasus Army Corps. Mehmandarov’s corps was engaged in the fiercest battles with German troops and during the whole war had not surrendered to the enemy a single piece of ordnance. On 22 March 1915 Samedbey Mehmandarov was promoted to the rank of the General of the Artillery. He was decorated with British, French and Romanian orders.

Azerbaijan Democratic Republic

After the February Revolution in Russia Mehmandarov resigned and left for Baku. With the establishment of the Azerbaijan Democratic Republic in 1918, Samedbey Mehmandarov became the third and last Minister of Defense of Azerbaijan. He held this position until 11th Red Army troops invaded Azerbaijan in 1920. After the fall of the national government and establishment of Soviet rule in Azerbaijan Mehmandarov was arrested, but he was released two months later. He taught in military schools and was an advisor to the Commissariat of Military and Naval Forces of the Azerbaijan SSR until his retirement in 1928.

Samad bey Mehmandarov died on February 12, 1931, in Baku.

References

This article incorporates material translated from Russian Wikipedia

External links 
 Russian Army in World War I 
 Military Encyclopaedia of Sytin. Samad bey Mehmandarov 

1855 births
1931 deaths
Azerbaijan Democratic Republic politicians
Azerbaijani generals
Russian military personnel of the Russo-Japanese War
Azerbaijani military personnel of World War I
Azerbaijani military personnel of the Armenian–Azerbaijani War (1918–1920)
Azerbaijani people of the Armenian–Azerbaijani war (1918–1920)
Imperial Russian Army generals
Ministers of Defense of Azerbaijan
People from Lankaran
Recipients of the Order of the White Eagle (Russia)
Recipients of the Order of St. George of the Third Degree
Russian military personnel of World War I
Azerbaijani nobility
Generals of the Azerbaijan Democratic Republic
Knights Commander of the Order of St Michael and St George
Azerbaijani generals of Imperial Russian Army
Azerbaijani people of World War I